Goodnite is a 1998 live album by the American alternative rock band Walt Mink. It is a recording of their farewell show, at the Mercury Lounge in New York City, on November 1, 1997. It is their only release to feature their third drummer, Zach Danziger. His predecessor, Orestes Morfin, guests on one track, "Shine". The opening track, "Fourth Wave", does not appear on any of the band's studio albums. The final song of the show, "A Tree in Orange", was not included on the album.

Track listing
All songs written by John Kimbrough.
 "Fourth Wave" - 4:37
 "Stood Up" - 2:58
 "Everything Worthwhile" - 2:46
 "Goodnite" - 3:59
 "Frail" - 3:34
 "Betty" - 3:15
 "Miss Happiness" - 3:27
 "Showers Down/Twinkle and Shine" - 6:23
 "Lost in the World" - 5:03
 "Brave Beyond the Call" - 4:03
 "Overgrown" - 4:55
 "Subway" - 2:18
 "She Can Smile" - 2:45
 "Shine" - 4:16
 "Love in the Dakota" - 4:05
 "Factory" - 12:43
 "Settled" - 3:24

Personnel 
John Kimbrough - guitar, vocals
Candice Belanoff - bass guitar, backing vocals
Zach Danziger - drums, percussion

Orestes Morfin - drums on "Shine"
Ken Weinstein - introduction
John Agnello - engineer, mix
Wayne Dorell - mix
Kurt Wolff - engineer
Greg Calbi - mastering
John Szuch - design, photography
Justin Borucki - photography
Charlie Gross - photography
John & Candice - collage

External links
 "Releases" page on Walt Mink's official site @ The Internet Archive (includes lyrics)

1998 live albums
Walt Mink albums
Deep Elm Records albums